In journalism, a scoop or exclusive is an item of news reported by one journalist or news organization before others, and of exceptional originality, importance, surprise, excitement, or secrecy.

Scoops are important and likely to interest or concern many people. A scoop may be a new story, or a new aspect to an existing or breaking news story. It may be unexpected, surprising, formerly secret, and may come from an exclusive source. Events witnessed by many people generally cannot become scoops, (e.g., a natural disaster, or the announcement at a press conference). However, exclusive news content is not always a scoop, as it may not provide the requisite importance or excitement. A scoop may be also defined retrospectively; a story may come to be known as a scoop because of a historical change in perspective of a particular event. Due to their secret nature, scandals are a prime source of scoops (e.g., the Watergate scandal by Washington Post journalists Woodward and Bernstein).

Scoops are part of journalistic lore, and generally confer prestige on the journalist or news organization.

Word origin
The word scoop is of American origin, first documented in 1874. As a verb, meaning to beat someone in reporting first, it is first recorded in 1884.

Extended usage

More generally, a scoop is the first discovery or the first report of something important.

In some of John le Carré's spy novels, a scoop is new information of major strategic importance, not, of course, intended for publication.

A scoop in the scientific community is a report by one group before another, giving them scientific priority.

See also
 First-mover advantage

References

External links 
 
 In defense of scoops: Their reputation took a beating in Boston, but there are reasons to value the news scoop, and they go beyond ego and institutional pride by Bill Grueskin, April 22, 2013, Columbia Journalism Review
 What’s a Toyota “Exclusive?” at This Point?: Bloomberg pushes the definition, by Dean Starkman, February 24, 2010, Columbia Journalism Review
 SCOOP! Flood of ‘scoops’ dilutes value of real exclusives, by Bill Adair and Hank Tucker, June 21, 2017, Columbia Journalism Review

Journalism
Mass media events